Alex Washington (born May 7, 1995) is a United States Virgin Islands international footballer who plays as a midfielder.

International career
Both of Washington's two caps came against Curaçao, both losses in qualification for the 2014 FIFA World Cup.

Career statistics

International

References

External links
 FIFA Profile
 CaribbeanFootballDatabase Profile

1995 births
Living people
United States Virgin Islands soccer players
United States Virgin Islands international soccer players
Association football midfielders